Eldership may refer to:
 Elder (administrative title), used in several countries and organizations to indicate a position of authority
 Eldership (Christianity), the governance of a local congregation by elders
 Elderships of Lithuania, the smallest Lithuanian administrative divisions
 Starostwo (Polish for "eldership"), a medieval Polish office granted by the king

See also 
 Council of Elders (disambiguation)
 Elder (disambiguation)